Scott Bateman (born January 30, 1964) is an American filmmaker, author, animator, and cartoonist.

He graduated from the University of Puget Sound in 1986.

Filmography 

 Scott Bateman Presents Scott Bateman Presents (TV series, Plum TV, 2007).
 Atom Age Vampire (Feature film, 2009).
 You, Your Brain, & You (Feature film, 2015).
 600 Space Aliens (Short film, 2016).
 The Bateman Lectures on Depression (Feature film, 2018).
5000 Space Aliens (Feature film, 2021).

Books 

 Scott Bateman's Sketchbook of Secrets & Shame: Includes 14 Essays from Shamefully Famous Folks (Word Riot Press, 2006).
 Disalmanac: A Book of Fact-Like Facts (TarcherPerigee, 2013).

Music videos 

 Low: Hatchet (Optimimi Version)
Clinic: Jigsaw Man
 Thao & The Get Down Stay Down: Cool Yourself
 Boston Spaceships: Fly Away (Terry Says)
Jenn Vix: Vampires
 Cult of KFYMA: I Don't Have Time To Explain Molecules To You

Web animations 

 Bateman 365

References

External links
Official Site
YouTube
You, Your Brain, and You
Vimeo
IMDB
Twitter

American editorial cartoonists
University of Puget Sound alumni
1964 births
Living people